Clontarf is a rural locality in the Toowoomba Region, Queensland, Australia.

History
The locality takes its name from Clontarf in Ireland, the birthplace of local pioneer John McLoughlin.

Geography
Clontarf is predominantly used for farming. In the north-east of the locality is a small part of the Commodore Mine extending over from neighbouring Domville. The Millmerran–Inglewood Road (State Route 82) passes through the locality from north to south-west.

References

Toowoomba Region
Localities in Queensland